Indian Steps Cabin, also known as Indian Steps Museum, is a historic memorial and museum located at Lower Chanceford Township, York County, Pennsylvania. It was built between 1908 and 1912, and is an eclectic Bungalow / American Craftsman-style building.  It is essentially "L"-shaped with two wings extending from a circular "Kiva."  The foundation and first story is constructed of local, well-cut stone.  The second story is stucco on frame.  The house features a stone tower with observation deck.  It also has numerous cement panels containing inscriptions and embedded Native American artifacts.  Also on the property are a contributing summer kitchen and picnic shed.  It was built by Judge John Edward Vandersloot, a prominent attorney from York, Pennsylvania, as a memorial and museum to Native American culture.  Originally a private museum, in 1939, it became a museum generally open to the public.

It was added to the National Register of Historic Places in 1989.

References

External links

Indian Steps Museum website

Native American museums in Pennsylvania
Houses on the National Register of Historic Places in Pennsylvania
Houses completed in 1912
Museums in York County, Pennsylvania
1912 establishments in Pennsylvania
National Register of Historic Places in York County, Pennsylvania